Janesville Township is a township in Greenwood County, Kansas, USA.  As of the 2000 census, its population was 548.

Geography
According to the USGS, it contains four cemeteries: Homer Creek, Ott, Prairie Chapel and Township.

The streams of Homer Creek, Indian Creek, Onion Creek, Slate Creek and Willow Creek run through this township.

Transportation
Janesville Township contains one airport or landing strip, King Ranch Airport.

References
 USGS Geographic Names Information System (GNIS)

External links
 US-Counties.com
 City-Data.com

Townships in Greenwood County, Kansas
Townships in Kansas